The members of the Iraqi Constitution Drafting Committee were appointed by the Iraqi Transitional Government on 12 May 2005 to draft a new constitution for Iraq.

The breakdown of members by political affiliation was:

 United Iraqi Alliance - 28
 Democratic Patriotic Alliance of Kurdistan - 15
 The Iraqis - 8
 Communist Party of Iraq - 1
 Iraqi Turkmen Front - 1
 National Rafidain List - 1
 Sunni Arab nominee - 1 (later expanded to 15)

The original 55 members were:

 Ahmed Al-Safi
 Abdel Hadi Al-Hakim
 Dr Ali Al-Dabagh
 Dr Hussein ‘Athab Th’ban
 Nouri Al-Maliki
 Ali al-Adeeb
 Beha’ Al-A’reji
 Dr Jeneen Al-Qedou
 Sami ‘Azaze Al-Ma’joun
 Dr Aboud Al-‘Isawi
 Dr Hamam Hamoudi 
 Akram Al-Hakim
 Jalal Al-Deen Al-Sagheer
 Dr Sa’ad Qendeel
 Sami Al-‘Askeri
 Dr Jouad Smeisim
 Dr Nadim al-Jabiri
 ‘Abass Al-Bayati
 Sheerouan Al-Ouaili
 Dr Khadheer Moussa Ja’fr Al-Khaza’i
 Ali Al-Safi
 Dr Muhsen Al-Qazwini
 ‘Aqila Al-Dehan
 Zehra’ Al-Hashemi
 Al-Tefat Abed Al-Sa’ed
 Mareem Al-Raes
 Aman Al-‘Asdi
 Najehe Abed Al-Emir
 Dr Fouad M’soum
 Dr S’di Berzenji
 Freedoun Abed Al-Qader
 Dr Mundher Al-Fadhl
 Dr Hussein Balissani
 Abed Al-Khaleq Zengena
 Sami Ahmed Ali Shebek
 Nergez Majeed
 Dara Nour Al-Deen
 Ahmed Wahab Majeed
 Deendar Shafeeq
 Hamid Majid Mousa
 Adel Naser
 Mouneera ‘Abdoul
 Nouri Boutros
 Kamran Khairi Sa’id
 Yonadam Kanna 
 Riadh Kehia
 Abed al-Rahmen al-Na’imi
 Qasem Daud
 Oua’el Abel Al-Latif
 Adnan Al-Janabi
 Rasem Al-Ouadi
 Hussein Al-Sha’lan
 Dr Radha Al-Khaza’i
 Thamer Al-Khadhban
 Taher Al-Baka’

Sources

 

Constitution of Iraq